William Edward Richards (August 1905 – 30 September 1956) was a Welsh international footballer who played as an outside right. He made 232 appearances in the Football League playing for Merthyr Town, Wolverhampton Wanderers, Coventry City, Fulham, Brighton & Hove Albion and Bristol Rovers, and also played in the Southern League for Mid Rhondda United and Folkestone. He played once for the Wales national team, on 7 December 1932 against Ireland.

He was the older brother of Dai Richards, who also played for Wolverhampton Wanderers and Wales.

References

1905 births
1956 deaths
Sportspeople from Merthyr Tydfil County Borough
Welsh footballers
Wales international footballers
Association football outside forwards
Mid Rhondda F.C. players
Merthyr Town F.C. players
Wolverhampton Wanderers F.C. players
Coventry City F.C. players
Fulham F.C. players
Brighton & Hove Albion F.C. players
Bristol Rovers F.C. players
Folkestone F.C. players
Southern Football League players
English Football League players